Sixto Hernández Serrano (born April 6 in San Lorenzo, Puerto Rico) is a Puerto Rican politician, attorney, accountant, judge, and former senator. He was a member of the Senate of Puerto Rico since his first election in 2000. He resigned in 2006 after being appointed to be an appeals judge. He represented the Popular Democratic Party (PPD).

Early years and studies

Sixto Hernández Serrano was born on April 6 in San Lorenzo, Puerto Rico. He completed his elementary and high school in his hometown, graduating in 1966. From 1968 to 1970, he served for the United States Army, spending one year in Vietnam.

In 1970, he enrolls in the University of Puerto Rico at Humacao. He received his bachelor's degree in accounting in 1974. Later, he completed his Juris Doctor at the Interamerican University of Puerto Rico School of Law, and received his licence as a CPA. He is also licensed in real estate and is a member of the Puerto Rico Bar Association and the College of Certified Public Accountants.

Professional career

After completing his bachelor's degree, Hernández worked as a tax auditor for the Puerto Rico Treasury Department at the District of Humacao. Later, he opened his own office in Juncos, where he performed both accounting and attorney duties.

Political career

Hernández was elected to the Senate of Puerto Rico for the first time in 2000 general elections, representing the District of Humacao, along with José Luis Dalmau. They were both reelected in 2004. During that term, Hernández served as Speaker for his party in several commissions.

Appointed as judge

In 2006, Hernández was appointed by Governor Aníbal Acevedo Vilá as an appeals judge. Hernández resigned to the Senate, effective on August 12, 2006. His vacancy was filed by Jorge Suárez Cáceres.

References

External links
Sixto Hernández Serrano on SenadoPR (through Wayback Machine)

United States Army personnel of the Vietnam War
Living people
Interamerican University of Puerto Rico alumni
Members of the Senate of Puerto Rico
People from San Lorenzo, Puerto Rico
Popular Democratic Party (Puerto Rico) politicians
Puerto Rican judges
United States Army soldiers
Year of birth missing (living people)